Ulpia Marciana (August 48 – 112) was the beloved elder sister of Roman Emperor Trajan and grandmother of empress Vibia Sabina the wife of Hadrian. Upon her death her brother had her deified.

Life
She was the eldest child born to Roman woman Marcia and the Roman senator Marcus Ulpius Traianus. Her second name Marciana she inherited from her mother's paternal ancestors. Her birthplace is unknown.

Marciana married Gaius Salonius Matidius Patruinus. Patruinus was a wealthy man, who served as a praetor and later became a senator. He originally came from Vicetia (modern Vicenza) in northern Italy). She bore Patruinus a daughter Salonia Matidia, who was born on 4 July 68. Patruinus died in 78 and Marciana never remarried. After Patruinus' death, Marciana and Matidia went to live with Trajan and his wife.

After 105, her brother awarded her with the title of Augusta. She was the first sister of a Roman Emperor to receive this title. Marciana did not accept this at first, but her sister-in-law, the Empress Pompeia Plotina, insisted that she take the title. She thus became part of the official imperial iconography and her statue was placed together with Trajan's and Plotina's over the Arches of Trajan in Ancona. Marciana was very close to Trajan and Plotina.

Marciana would often travel with her brother and assist him in decision-making. Throughout the Roman Empire, Marciana was honored with monuments and inscriptions in her name. There are two towns that Trajan founded in her honor in the Roman Empire. The first town was called Colonia Marciana Ulpia Traiana Thamugadi (modern Timgad, Algeria) and was founded around 100. This town was also named after the late parents of Marciana and Trajan. The other town was founded in 106 and was called Marcianopolis (which is now a part of modern Devnya, Bulgaria). Marciana died between 112 and 114 and was deified by the Senate at Trajan's behest.

See also
 Ulpia gens

References

48 births
110s deaths
Ulpii
1st-century Roman women
2nd-century Roman women
Deified Roman women
Augustae